This is a list of events from British radio in 1933.

Events
 10 March – The BBC holds a memorial concert for its late Director of Music, Percy Pitt, in The Concert Hall of Broadcasting House, London.
 28 May – Washford transmitting station begins broadcasting the BBC Regional Programme for the West of England.
16 August – The BBC unveils a Compton organ in The Concert Hall of Broadcasting House, London.
 28 October – Broadcast of the earliest surviving BBC location recording, Night on London’s River: Westminster to the Docks.
 BBC executive Colonel Alan Dawnay begins to meet with the head of MI5, Sir Vernon Kell, to trade information informally on potentially subversive staff.

Debuts
18 November – In Town Tonight debuts on BBC National Programme.

Births
16 April – Joan Bakewell, broadcaster
12 December – Tony Brandon, presenter

References 

 
Years in British radio
Radio